Keller is a city in Tarrant County, Texas, in the Dallas–Fort Worth metroplex. According to the 2020 census, the city's population is 45,776, making Keller the 71st most populated city in Texas. The most recent population estimate, as of July 1, 2021, is 45,397.

In the early 1850s, settlers established Keller and the town became a stop on the Texas and Pacific Railway. The settlers settled around the wooded region in Keller because of Keller's proximity to the Trinity River water supply and abundant farmland. On November 16, 1955, Keller became incorporated.

The city prides itself as "Texas's Most Family Friendly City."

History

Before establishment 

Keller is in the western fringe of the Eastern Cross Timbers in northeast Tarrant County, part of the frontier of the Peters Colony settlers of the 1840s. In the mid-1840s, the area was first settled by a group of families from Missouri that homesteaded near the head-waters of Big Bear Creek. Mount Gilead Baptist Church was established on July 13, 1850. In 1859, the little log church was burned in an Indian raid. It served as the only schoolhouse in that part of the county until about 1910.

The area became known as 'Double Springs' for the two large springs approximately  mile north of Mt. Gilead Baptist Church. In the early 1870s, the Double Springs area had a cotton gin, a grist mill, a blacksmith shop and several stores. In 1896, an artesian well was drilled in Keller; the Double Springs filled with silt over time and eventually were plugged and lost until rediscovery in 1984. Today Samantha Springs produces more than 200,000 gallons of water per day.

Establishment of Keller 
The Texas and Pacific Railway between Fort Worth and Texarkana was completed in June 1881, and the first train ran on this track on May 9, 1881, which ran parallel with parts of the old Chisom cattle drive trail. With the advent of rail service, new villages were established all along the line. The Keller of today was one of them. Settlers migrated to the new village, and before a year had passed the name of the town was changed from Athol to Keller, honoring John C. Keller, a foreman on the railroad. Streets were named and those in the original  site still carry the names given to them in 1881. Streets going north and south are Lamar, Main and Elm; those running east and west are Price, Taylor, Hill, Vine, Bates, Olive and Pecan.

Modern Keller
New residential development is gradually filling in open spaces, with neighboring towns affording no opportunity to expand its boundaries. The 1980 Census calculated Keller's population at 4,555; today, nearly 45,000 residents call Keller home. City facilities include Keller Town Hall on Bear Creek Parkway, the Keller Public Library and Keller Senior Activities Center on Johnson Road, the Municipal Service Center on Bear Creek Pkwy. West, and the city's award-winning recreation and aquatic center known as The Keller Pointe on Rufe Snow Drive. The city also recently renovated and expanded its police facility, which houses the Regional Jail, Regional Animal Adoption Center and regional 911 dispatch center, NETCOM, serving the cities of Keller, Colleyville, Southlake and Westlake.

The Keller Independent School District serves portions of the cities of Colleyville, Fort Worth, Haltom City, Hurst, North Richland Hills, Southlake, Watauga, and Westlake, as well as the entire city of Keller. Its  encompass the third-largest land area in Tarrant County. Enrollment in the school district has doubled during the past 10 years and is expected to do the same during the next decade, making it the ninth fastest-growing school district in Texas.  The U.S. Census Bureau's American Community Survey listed Keller as one of the "Nation's Richest Cities" with a population over 20,000 in 2021, ranked number 45 with median household income of $141,364. Neighboring Southlake was ranked number 1.

Geography 
Keller is located at  (32.927533, −97.235995). According to the United States Census Bureau, the city has a total area of 18.4 square miles (47.8 km). Keller is east of Interstate 35W, south of Highway 114 and Alliance Gate Freeway.

Surrounding cities
Here is the list of cities surrounding The City of Keller, whom which are located in either Denton or Tarrant County.

Fort Worth, 
Southlake, 
Roanoke

Climate
The climate in this area is characterized by hot, humid summers and generally mild to cool winters. According to the Köppen Climate Classification system, Keller has a humid subtropical climate, abbreviated "Cfa" on climate maps.

Demographics

2020 census

As of the 2020 United States census, there were 45,776 people, 16,383 households, and 13,148 families residing in the city.

2000 census
As of the census of 2000, there were 27,345 people, 8,827 households, and 7,856 families residing in the city. The population density was 1,483.0 people per square mile (572.6/km). There were 9,216 housing units at an average density of 499.8 per square mile (193.0/km). The racial makeup of the city was 93.74% White, 1.43% African American, 0.39% Native American, 1.77% Asian, 0.04% Pacific Islander, 1.18% from other races, and 1.45% from two or more races. Hispanic or Latino of any race were 4.51% of the population.

There were 8,827 households, out of which 52.4% had children under the age of 18 living with them, 81.3% were married couples living together, 5.6% had a female householder with no husband present, and 11.0% were non-families. 8.9% of all households were made up of individuals, and 2.0% had someone living alone who was 65 years of age or older. The average household size was 3.09 and the average family size was 3.30.

In the city, the population was spread out, with 33.7% under the age of 18, 4.7% from 18 to 24, 34.7% from 25 to 44, 22.5% from 45 to 64, and 4.3% who were 65 years of age or older. The median age was 35 years. For every 100 females, there were 98.9 males. For every 100 females age 18 and over, there were 97.3 males.

According to a 2007 estimate, the median income for a household was $107,518, and the median income for a family was $114,542. Males had a median income of $66,969 versus $34,661 for females. The per capita income for the city was $31,986. About 1.0% of families and 1.4% of the population were below the poverty line, including 1.4% of those under age 18 and 1.4% of those age 65 or over.

Government

City government
The City of Keller is a full-service city, providing police, fire and emergency services, parks and recreation, library, senior center, animal control, planning, building inspection, economic development, public works, street maintenance, water, wastewater, drainage, and solid waste disposal. Organized under the Council-Manager form of government, the Keller city council has seven representatives elected at-large and responsible for enacting local legislation, setting policies and adopting Keller's annual operating budgets. Keller City Hall is located at 1100 Bear Creek Parkway in Keller Town Center. The current mayor of Keller is Armin Mizani, the city’s first mayor of Iranian and Cuban descent, and the city manager is Mark Hafner.

The Keller Police Department serves the City of Keller and the Town of Westlake. The police department shares a 9-1-1 dispatch center, regional jail, regional animal services and adoption center with neighboring cities of Southlake, Colleyville and Westlake. The Keller Police Department also provides all law enforcement services for the Town of Westlake. The department consists of a five service divisions: patrol, traffic, investigations, confinement and administrative.

Keller Fire Rescue maintains three fire stations throughout the city. Firefighters and paramedics provide full-time services for Keller residents and, through mutual aid, neighboring cities. The fire department, like the police department, participates in a shared communications network with Southlake, Colleyville and Westlake. (Unlike the police department, Keller Fire-Rescue does not serve Westlake as they maintain their own fire department.)

The City of Keller is a voluntary member of the North Central Texas Council of Governments association. The member's purpose is to coordinate individual and collective local governments, assist regional solutions, eliminate unnecessary duplication, and enable joint decisions.

Politics
As a moderately wealthy suburb of Fort Worth, Keller has been and continues to be solidly Republican, on a state, local, and national level. However, like many of its surrounding cities, it shifted left between the 2016 and 2020 United States Presidential Election, though it did so by a smaller margin than many of the surrounding areas. The city remains politically uncompetetive, as of 2022. 

During the 2021-2022 school year, the Keller Independent School District  in Texas faced controversy over the inclusion of a graphic novel called "Gender Queer" in its high school libraries. Some parents and community members raised objections to the book's depiction of gender identity and expression, leading to debates and protests. In response, the school board voted to remove the book from the curriculum.

The controversy also sparked discussions about censorship and academic freedom, and it led to a heightened interest in the school board elections that followed. Candidates with differing views on the issue ran for office, with those advocating for more parental involvement in curriculum decisions winning a majority of the seats.

State representation
Republican Representative Giovanni Capriglione of District 98 and Republican Senator Kelly Hancock of District 9 represents Keller citizens in the Texas House of Representatives and in the Texas State Senate.

Federal representation
Republican Senators John Cornyn and Ted Cruz represents Texas in the United States Senate. In the United States House of Representatives, Republican Representative Beth Van Duyne represents the 24th Congressional District of Texas.

Education 
The Keller Independent School District has 39 campuses serving more than 34,000 students. Students zoned to Keller ISD attend 23 different elementary schools, 12 different intermediate/middle schools, and 5 different high schools. Most of the schools within the district are located in northeast Fort Worth. This means Keller's school district is substantially larger than the city itself.

Infrastructure
One source of Keller's bedroom-community serenity comes from having no contact with any interstate highways. U.S. Route 377, a north–south United States highway runs along Keller's western border, parallel to Interstate 35W. Davis Boulevard (FM1938), a north–south Farm to Market Road from North Richland Hills to Southlake, runs through Keller. Keller Parkway (FM 1709) runs from Interstate 35W in Fort Worth, where it is named "Golden Triangle Boulevard," to State Highway 114 (SH 114) in Southlake, where it is named "Southlake Boulevard."

In September 2004, Verizon Communications, launched their FiOS fiber-optic communications network; 9,000 customers in Keller, Texas, were the very first in the nation. Verizon replaced copper wires with optical fibers, commencing service in 2005.

Keller consistently scores as a very safe city, in United States cities by crime rate (40,000–60,000) in Federal Bureau of Investigation Uniform Crime Reports statistics.

Notable people 

 Taylor Ball, actor (Still Standing)
 Jeff Banister, manager of the Texas Rangers from 2015 to 2018
 Joel Bolomboy (born 1994), Ukrainian born professional basketball player for the Utah Jazz of the National Basketball Association (NBA). He played college basketball for Weber State University, where he was named Big Sky Conference Player of the Year in 2016
 Nolan Frese, football long snapper, Seattle Seahawks
 Garrett Hartley, football placekicker, New Orleans Saints
 Sheldon Neuse, professional baseball player
 Michelle Royer, Miss Texas USA 1987, Miss USA 1987
 Debby Ryan, actress (Jessie)
 Zack Sanchez (born 1993), Canadian football cornerback for the Saskatchewan Roughriders of the Canadian Football League (CFL). He played college football at Oklahoma and previously played for the Carolina Panthers of the National Football League (NFL) as well as the San Antonio Commanders of the Alliance of American Football (AAF)
 Hank Thompson, country music entertainer

References

External links

 City of Keller official website
 Greater Keller Chamber of Commerce

Dallas–Fort Worth metroplex
Cities in Texas
Cities in Tarrant County, Texas
Populated places established in 1881
1881 establishments in Texas